Kian Leavy (born 21 March 2002) is an Irish footballer who plays as a midfielder for Shelbourne, on loan from Reading.

Career
In July 2018, Leavy joined the youth academy of English second division side Reading from St Patrick's Athletic's academy after receiving interest from the youth academies of Manchester United and Celtic.

On 2 July 2021, Leavy signed his first professional contract with Reading, until the summer of 2022.

On 10 August 2021, Leavy made his debut for Reading in their 3–0 defeat to Swansea City in the EFL Cup.

On 8 February 2023, Leavy joined Shelbourne on loan until the summer transfer window.

Career statistics

References

External links
 
 

2002 births
Living people
Republic of Ireland association footballers
Association football midfielders
Reading F.C. players